The 340s decade ran from January 1, 340, to December 31, 349.

Significant people
 Constans, Roman Emperor
 Constantius II, Roman Emperor
 Flavius Philippus, praetorian prefect of the East, consul
 Hypatia of Alexandria

References